Albert I. Rabin (June 20, 1912 – October 24, 2010) was an American-Lithuanian psychologist.

Rabin was born in Merkinė, Lithuania, and moved to the United States in 1930. He graduated from Boston University and Harvard University, receiving his Ph.D. in Psychology in 1938. He was hired by the New Hampshire State Hospital in 1939 as its chief psychologist. While there, he met Beatrice Marceau, who became his wife in 1949, the year he became a psychology professor at Michigan State University. He won the Bruno Klopfer Award in 1977

Rabin retired from MSU in 1982, continued teaching in San Diego and Berkeley, California until the 1990s and died on October 24, 2010, aged 98.

Bibliography
 Growing up in the kibbutz
 Projective Techniques for adolescence and children
 Twenty Years Later:Kibbutz children
 Psychological Issues in Biblical Lore
 Clinical Psychology:Issues of the Seventies
 Kibbutz studies: A digest of books and articles of the Kibbutz
 Assessment with Projective Techniques: A concise introduction

References

1912 births
2010 deaths
20th-century American psychologists
American people of Lithuanian-Jewish descent
Michigan State University faculty
Boston University alumni
Harvard University alumni
Lithuanian emigrants to the United States